Toni Leigh Finnegan (born 16 October 2002) is a Northern Ireland association footballer who plays as a defender for Women's Premiership club Cliftonville Ladies FC and the Northern Ireland women's national team.

References

2002 births
Living people
Women's association football defenders
Women's association footballers from Northern Ireland
Northern Ireland women's international footballers
Cliftonville F.C. players